Heinrich Schneidereit (23 December 1884 – 30 September 1915) was a German heavyweight weightlifter who competed at the 1906 Intercalated Games. He won a gold medal in the tug of war and bronze medals in the one hand lift and two hand lift.

Schneidereit joined a weightlifting club when he was aged 16, but owing to his athletic background soon became one of the best German competitors and won four medals at the world weightlifting championships of 1903–1911. In 1914 he won his last competition and was studying business administration. The following year, he was killed in France during World War I.

See also
 List of Olympians killed in World War I

References

1884 births
1915 deaths
Olympic weightlifters of Germany
German male weightlifters
German military personnel killed in World War I
Sportspeople from Cologne
Weightlifters at the 1906 Intercalated Games
Tug of war competitors at the 1906 Intercalated Games
Olympic gold medalists for Germany
Olympic bronze medalists for Germany
Medalists at the 1906 Intercalated Games
World Weightlifting Championships medalists